Para Qeshlaq-e Olya (also Romanized as Pārā Qeshlāq-e ‘Olyā; also known as Bāreh Qeshlāq, Pāreh Qeshlāq, and Pāreh Qeshlāq-e ‘Olyā) is a village in Qeshlaq-e Jonubi Rural District, Qeshlaq Dasht District, Bileh Savar County, Ardabil Province, Iran. At the 2006 census, its population was 48, in 12 families.

References 

Towns and villages in Bileh Savar County